Sofiya Chursina is a Kazakhstani tennis player.

Chursina has a career high WTA ranking of 1295 in singles achieved on 19 July 2021. She also has a career high WTA ranking of 1401 in doubles achieved on 20 September 2021.

Chursina made her WTA main-draw debut at the 2021 Astana Open after receiving a wildcard for the doubles main draw.

References

External links
 
 

Living people
Kazakhstani female tennis players
Year of birth missing (living people)
21st-century Kazakhstani women